The style of the Georgian sovereign refers to the formal mode of address to a Georgian monarch (mepe) that evolved and changed many times since the establishment of the ancient Kingdom of Iberia, its transformation to the unified Kingdom of Georgia and its successive monarchies after the disintegration of the realm.

Pre-Christian Georgian monarchs of the Pharnavazid dynasty were divinely assigned pharnah and its loss usually led to the monarch's imminent death or overthrow in Georgian kingship. Introductory part of the style for the monarchs from the Bagrationi dynasty always started with "By the Grace of God, We, of Jesse, David, Solomon, Bagrationi, Supreme by God, anointed and crowned by God", underlining their divine right and claim for biblical descent. The consolidation of the deified Bagrationi dynasty and its unprecedented political unification of lands, would inaugurate the Georgian Golden Age and creation of the only medieval pan-Caucasian empire that would rule for a thousand years. Georgian monarchs would have intense religious and political competition with the Byzantine emperors, saw themselves as the successors of the emperor Constantine the Great and even as rulers of a new Byzantium based in the Caucasus, whence the clergy would view the Georgian Orthodoxy as an "imperial church" that would fight the heretics. Even though unprecedentedly "Byzantinized Georgia" entertained its powerful neighbor's concepts and models of Constantinopolitan bureaucracy and aristocracy, it was never slavishly adopted or mimicked; rather, it was creatively and deliberately adapted to the local culture and environment. At the same time, the rulers of Christian Georgia would still be embracing the traditional influences of the Persian Shahnameh and Arabic legends that would remain strong and intact; some of their styles would even become Islamic in type. As the Crown would be gathering additional lands the style would continue to expand, but remain distinctly enumerated and include all the subjects of the Georgian monarch. Even after the collapse of the unified kingdom, Georgian kings would continue to emblazon themselves with the former imperial style and they would stake the claim to be the absolute rulers of all-Georgia. This imperial legacy of the Bagrations continues to bear fruit even today, with its self-image as the unrivalled pinnacle of the Georgian politics, culture and society.

According to the chronicler of Queen Tamar, verbally insulting a monarch was punishable with tongue mutilation and decapitation, always carried out by non-Georgian executioners. Even though the capital punishment was extremely rare in high medieval Georgia, the royal court would never pardon the insult towards a monarch. King Vakhtang VI, however, maintained that there was no official punishment for lèse-majesté.

Style

Sovereigns of Iberia

Sovereigns of the united Georgia

Sovereigns of Kartli

Sovereigns of Kakheti

Sovereigns of Imereti

Sovereigns of Kartli—Kakheti

See also
Georgian Crown Jewels 
Monarchism in Georgia

Notes

References

Bibliography 

The Georgian Chronicles, Life of the Georgian kings, royal annals
Eastmond, A. (1998) Royal imagery in medieval Georgia, Pennsylvania State University, ISBN 0-271-01628-0
Zagareli, A. (1898) Gramoty i drugie istoricheskie dokumenty XVIII stoletia, otnosieschia k Gruzii: Vol. 1, Gruzinskie teksty s 1765 po 1774 god, Komissiia pechataniia gosudarstvennykh gramot i dogovorov, Tip. V. Kirshbauma, Moscow
Javakhishvili, I. (1929) History of the Georgian Justice, Vol. II, Tiflis
Rapp, S. H. Jr. (1997) Imagining History at the Crossroads: Persia, Byzantium, and the Architects of the Written Georgian Past, Volume II, University of Michigan
Rapp, S. H. Jr. (2014) Caucasia and Byzantine Culture, Edited by Dean Sakel, Ankara
Rapp, S. H. Jr. (2016) The Sasanian World Through Georgian Eyes, Caucasia and the Iranian Commonwealth in Late Antique Georgian Literature, Sam Houston State University, USA, Routledge, 
Rayfield, D. (2013) Edge of Empires: A History of Georgia, Reaktion Books, 
Bakhtadze, M. (2015) Georgian titles of the Bagrationi rulers of Tao-Klarjeti, Institute of the Georgian History, Tbilisi State University, 
Khakhanov, A. (1895) Title, coronation and regalia of the Georgian kings, Tbilisi 
Takaishvili, E. (1909) The Georgian Antiquities, Georgian History and Ethnography, Volume II, Tbilisi
Takaishvili, E. (1910) The Georgian Antiquities, Georgian History and Ethnography, Volume III, Tbilisi 
Kakabadze, S. (1921) Diplomata ecclesiastica Georgiae occidentalis, Monumenta Georgica, V, Tbilisi State University 
Dundua, T. & Tavadze, L. (2017) Imperial Titulature of the Georgian Kings, Tbilisi State University 
Silogava, V. (1984) Georgian Historical Documents of IX-XIII centuries, Vol. I, Metsniereba Publishing, Tbilisi
Kartvelishvili, T. Jojua, T. Baindurashvili, Kh. Gelashvili, I. Gogoladze, T. & Shaorshadze, M. (2019) Sources of the XVII century about the Kings of Kartli and Kakheti, Vol. I, Tbilisi, 
Dolidze, I. (1965) Georgian monuments of Law, V. II, Metsniereba Publishing, Tbilisi
Paghava, I. (2012) Rediscovering the Specie of Davit IV the Builder (1089-1125), King of Kings and Sword of Messiah, Eds. Bruno Callegher and Arianna D’Ottone, Trieste
Paghava, I. (2021) Copper Coin with the Effigy of David the Builder and the Titulary of Georgian Monarchs, V. VIII, Mkhedari Publishing
Paghava, I. & Chanishvili, E. (2021) Numismatic history of David IV the Builder: Money Circulation, Issued Coinage, and Monetary Policy, Tsereteli Institute of Oriental Studies of the Ilia State University, ISSN 2587-4780
Tavadze, L. (2012) Byzantine imperial style in Georgia, Tbilisi State University, The Institute of the Georgian History, Tbilisi
Gamkrelidze, G. (2010) War and Arms in Iberia and Colchis, Sulakauri Publishers, Tbilisi, ISBN 978-99941-15-242-9

Royal styles
Lists of Georgian monarchs
Pharnavazid dynasty
Chosroid dynasty
Bagrationi dynasty